Al-Daraj or Haraat al-Daraj is the densely populated northwestern quarter of Gaza's Old City. Its name translates as "Quarter of the Steps." It is also referred to as the "Muslim Quarter" and contains several mosques and other Muslim edifices. Among them are the city's largest mosque, the Great Omari Mosque, as well as the al-Sayed Hashem Mosque, the Sheikh Zakariya Mosque, the Sheikh Faraj Mosque and Madrasa al-Zahrah. Al-Daraj is separated from the southern Zaytun Quarter by Omar Mukhtar Street.

It is the oldest populated area of the city, being built over the site of ancient Gaza. The remnants of the city's ancient past are visible in many of the neighborhood's stone houses where marble columns and slabs have been reused as building materials. According to Ottoman tax records, al-Daraj was a relatively large neighborhood in 1525, with 141 households. Containing Qasr al-Basha, it was the seat of power for the provincial governors of Gaza and much of Palestine during Mamluk and Ottoman rule over the city by at least the 17th century. At the end of the 19th century, it was called Haret ed-Deredj.

References

Bibliography

 
 

Neighborhoods of Gaza City
Philistine cities